Montana Highway 24 (MT 24) is a  state highway in the US state of Montana. It begins at MT 200 near Brockway, and ends at the Saskatchewan border at Port of Opheim. Along the way, it intersects MT 117, MT 42 and US Highway 2 (US 2).

Route description
MT 24 begins at an intersection with MT 200 near Brockway. The route then proceeds northward through a rural area along the eastern shore of Fort Peck Lake. The highway turns to the west, crosses the Fort Peck Dam before passing through Fort Peck, Montana, and travels just yards from the northern shore of the lake. It intersects with MT 117, as it exits Fort Peck, and enters Wheeler. The highway heads northwest before turning due north. From here, it intersects MT 42, just prior to intersecting with US 2. MT 24 passes on the eastern outskirts of Glasgow, and travels near the Glasgow International Airport. It heads north-northwest, soon turning due north again before intersecting Cut Across Road, so named for its cutting across the vast open expanses of land between US 2, and MT 24. An intersection with Montana Secondary Highway 248 (S-248) follows, and MT 24 reaches its end at the Saskatchewan border, north of Port of Opheim.

History
Originally, MT 24W connected MT 24 with Glasgow. A former MT 24 ran between Marion and Jennings in the 1930s, which is now known as Pleasant Valley Road.

Major intersections

References

External links

024